4-aminobutyrate---pyruvate transaminase (aminobutyrate aminotransferase, gamma-aminobutyrate aminotransaminase, gamma-aminobutyrate transaminase, gamma-aminobutyric acid aminotransferase, gamma-aminobutyric acid pyruvate transaminase, gamma-aminobutyric acid transaminase, gamma-aminobutyric transaminase, 4-aminobutyrate aminotransferase, 4-aminobutyric acid aminotransferase, aminobutyrate transaminase, GABA aminotransferase, GABA transaminase, GABA transferase, POP2 (gene)) is an enzyme with systematic name 4-aminobutanoate:pyruvate aminotransferase. This enzyme is a type of GABA transaminase, which degrades the neurotransmitter GABA. The enzyme catalyses the following chemical reaction

 (1) 4-aminobutanoate + pyruvate  succinate semialdehyde + L-alanine
 (2) 4-aminobutanoate + glyoxylate  succinate semialdehyde + glycine

This enzyme requires pyridoxal 5'-phosphate.

Clinical significance 
Phenylethylidenehydrazine, the active metabolite of phenelzine, inhibits gamma-aminobutyric acid transaminase and subsequently increases GABA concentrations in the central nervous system. This may contribute to the notable anxiolytic effects of phenelzine.

References

External links 
 

EC 2.6.1